Yusuf Dikeç (born January 1, 1973 in Taşoluk, Göksun, Kahramanmaraş Province, Turkey) is a Turkish sport shooter competing in the pistol events.

Early years
Yusuf Dikeç was born 1973 in Taşoluk village of Göksun district in Kahramanmaraş Province. After his primary schooling in his village, he completed his secondary education in Göksun. In 1994, he enrolled to the Military School of Gendarmerie in Ankara. After graduation, he became a corporal and entered duty in Mardin. In 1999, Dikeç entered the Military School of Gendarmerie. After one year, he graduated in the rank of a sergeant. He served one year in Istanbul, and then was appointed to Jandarma Gücü in Ankara, the sports club of the Turkish Gendarmerie.

In 2001, he began with sport shooting. Since then, Dikeç competes in the military national team as well as in the national team.

He was educated in physical education and sports at Gazi University in Ankara.

Career
He became several times Turkish champion and national record holder in different categories of pistol events.

In 2006, Yusuf Dikeç set a new world record in 25 m center-fire pistol event at the CISM Military World Championships held in Rena, Norway scoring 597 points.

Dikeç won the bronze medal in the 10 metre air pistol event at the 2012 ISSF World Cup Final held in Bangkok, Thailand.

He qualified for participation in the 10 m air pistol men event at the 2012 Summer Olympics.  He also took part in the 50 m pistol event without advancing to the final round.

At the 2013 European Shooting Championships held in Osijek, Croatia from July 21 to August 4, he became double gold medalist in 25 m standard pistol and 25 m center-fire pistol. He took also a silver medal in the 25 m standard team event with his team mates Fatih Kavruk and Murat Kılınç and another gold medal in the 25 m center-fire pistol team competition. In the 50 m pistol event, he won another silver medal with his team mates Ömer Alimoğlu and İsmail Keleş.

Achievements

References

1973 births
People from Göksun
Turkish male sport shooters
Turkish Gendarmerie personnel
Living people
Olympic shooters of Turkey
ISSF pistol shooters
Shooters at the 2008 Summer Olympics
Shooters at the 2012 Summer Olympics
Shooters at the 2016 Summer Olympics
Gazi University alumni
European Games bronze medalists for Turkey
European Games medalists in shooting
Shooters at the 2015 European Games
Mediterranean Games gold medalists for Turkey
Mediterranean Games silver medalists for Turkey
Competitors at the 2005 Mediterranean Games
Competitors at the 2013 Mediterranean Games
Competitors at the 2018 Mediterranean Games
Mediterranean Games medalists in shooting
Shooters at the 2019 European Games
Shooters at the 2020 Summer Olympics
20th-century Turkish people
21st-century Turkish people